Clonmel is a county town in Ireland, home of:
Clonmel Commercials, a Gaelic football club
Clonmel GAA Ground, a GAA stadium, home of the Clonmel Commercials and other sporting clubs
Clonmel Óg GAA, a Gaelic football club
Clonmel Racecourse
Clonmel (UK Parliament constituency) once a parliamentary district

Clonmel may also refer to:

Clonmel, Kansas, a community in the United States
HMS Clonmel (1918), a ship from World War I
PS Clonmel, a paddle steamer wrecked on the coast of Victoria, Australia in 1841